William R. Baumgartner (April 17, 1921 – September 1981) was an American football player who played at the end position. He played college football for Minnesota from 1940 to 1942 and professional football for the Baltimore Colts during the 1947 season.

Early years
A native of Duluth, Minnesota, he Denfeld High School in Duluth. While in high school, he was a sprinter for the track team and also played basketball and football.

College football
He played college football for the Minnesota Golden Gophers. He was a member of the undefeated 1940 and 1941 Minnesota Golden Gophers football teams that won back-to-back national championships. His arms were so long that the school had to order special jerseys for him. He was invited to play in the 1943 Chicago College All-Star Game, but by that time he was serving in the military as a naval aviation cadet.

Professional football
He was selected by the Chicago Cardinals in the 13th round (113th overall pick) of the 1943 NFL Draft. He played for the Baltimore Colts in the All-America Football Conference (AAFC) during the 1947 Baltimore Colts season and appeared in a total of two AAFC games.

Later years
He died in 1981 at age 69.

References

1921 births
1981 deaths
Baltimore Colts (1947–1950) players
Minnesota Golden Gophers football players
Players of American football from Duluth, Minnesota